WPAY (1520 kHz) is an AM radio station licensed to Rossford, Ohio, serving the Toledo metropolitan area. It is owned by Relevant Radio of Green Bay, Wisconsin.

History

WTTO
1520 AM in Toledo, Ohio was established in 1966. Its first call letters being WTTO, it was known as "Weetow 15" with a Top 40 format to compete with 1470 WOHO (now defunct) and 1560 WTOD (Now WWYC). It also competed with 800 CKLW from Detroit/Windsor, Ontario. The station had its studios on the 4th floor of the Commodore Perry Hotel in Downtown Toledo.

WTUU
In 1975, the call letters were changed to WTUU. The station switched to a country music format becoming known as "Fun Country W-15-2".

WANR, WGOR, WVOI
Sometime later, 1520AM adopted an all-news radio format with the call letters WANR featuring programming from NBC Radio's News and Information Service. The news format was unsuccessful and the station was sold. The call sign was changed to WGOR in 1976; the station took on a religious format. With yet another change in ownership, the call letters were later changed to WVOI. In 1981, after WKLR 99.9 FM, dropped it's Rhythm and blues format, in favor of country music.  WVOI launched an urban contemporary music format. This format was successful and lasted until the later part of the 1990s.

Dominion 1520
In 1998, the calls were changed to WDMN (which stood for Dominion) when the Cornerstone Church of Maumee Ohio acquired the station. The station took on a Gospel music format.

1520 WNWT Talk Radio
In April 2008, WDMN dropped Gospel music and changed its format to talk radio. The format was a combination of progressive and conservative talk radio programming. Some traditional and smooth jazz was played on the weekends. The station was also an affiliate of CNN. On July 1, 2008, the station changed its calls to WNWT.

Sale to Education Media Foundation
On January 22, 2009 it was announced that the Educational Media Foundation had purchased WNWT. On April 23, 2009 WNWT's talk format was dropped and it started airing K-Love.

Formats 2014-2021
On April 26, 2014, WNWT became an affiliate of Urban Family Talk.

On March 15, 2017, the call letters were changed to WPAY.

On March 8, 2018, Urban Family Talk was dropped in favor of Radio Nueva Vida, a Spanish-language Christian format. On September 25, 2018, the station flipped to  EMF's new K-Love Classics network.

On June 7, 2019, WPAY reverted to Urban Family Talk.

On August 2, 2019, WPAY returned to K-Love Classics.

In November 2020, the Educational Media Foundation phased out its K-love classic format in favor of Christmas music.

On January 1, 2021, Christmas music gave way to an all '90s Christian music format, now known as K-Love 90s, "The Best Songs from the Decade Defined Christian Music".

Fusion Radio acquisition
On November 10, 2020, it was reported by Radioinsight.com that the Education Media Foundation traded WPAY and translators 92.1 W221BG Toledo and 103.3 W277BI Toledo to Fusion in exchange for 103.3 W277AE Madison WI. No cash was exchanged between the two parties. The swap was consummated on July 15, 2021 and the next day, the station fell silent.

On June 12, 2022, WPAY and its translator, W221BG, returned to the air simulcasting Delmarva Educational Association’s Christian talk and teaching format, heard on WTOD.

On September 5, 2022, WPAY began playing a 2000s Rhythmic heavy playlist as it prepared for a relaunch as "Party 103.3" on September 6 at 10:33 a.m., fed to W277BI. The format continues to offer 2000s Rhythmic songs in addition to newer songs. The format launched with 10,000 songs in a row, with "Get Ready for This" by 2 Unlimited being the first song played.  W277BI is now fed by WTOD-HD2.

Sale To Relevant Radio Incorporated
On October 18, 2022, it was reported by radioinsight.com that Fusion Radio had sold 1520 WPAY along with translator 94.1 W231EF to Relevant Radio Incorporated of Green Bay Wisconsin. On October 21, 2022 WPAY went silent.  Relevant began broadcasting Catholic based religious programing on November 1, 2022.

Translator

References

External links

PAY (AM)
PAY (AM)
Relevant Radio stations
Radio stations established in 1966
1966 establishments in Ohio